Donald Green (30 November 1924 – 1996) was an English footballer who played in the Football League as a centre-half for Ipswich Town.

References

 

1924 births
1996 deaths
Sportspeople from Ipswich
English footballers
Association football defenders
Ipswich Town F.C. players
Stowmarket Town F.C. players
English Football League players